Jason Sokol (born 1977) is an American historian and an associate professor at the University of New Hampshire.

Sokol is the author of three books on the history of the civil rights movement.

External links
Jason Sokol's website
Faculty Profile: Jason Sokol

21st-century American historians
21st-century American male writers
Historians of race relations
Living people
University of New Hampshire faculty
1977 births
American male non-fiction writers